The Gold Coast Suns Club Champion is an Australian rules football award presented annually to the player(s) adjudged the best and fairest at the Gold Coast Football Club throughout the Australian Football League (AFL) season. The voting system, as of the 2017 AFL season, consists of five coaches giving an undetermined number of players a ranking from zero to five after each match. Players can receive a maximum of 25 votes for a game.

The inaugural winner of the award was also the club's inaugural captain, Gary Ablett, Jr.

Recipients

Multiple winners

References

Australian Football League awards
Gold Coast Suns
Awards established in 2011
Australian rules football-related lists